Pimelea longiflora is a species of flowering plant in the family Thymelaeaceae and is endemic to the southwest of Western Australia. It is an erect, spindly shrub with linear to narrowly elliptic leaves and erect clusters of white to cream-coloured flowers, surrounded by 4 to 6 green, egg-shaped involucral bracts.

Description
Flowering occurs from August to February.

Taxonomy
Pimelea longiflora was first formally described in 1810 by Robert  Brown in his book Prodromus Florae Novae Hollandiae et Insulae Van Diemen. The specific epithet (longiflora) means "long-flowered".

Distribution and habitat
This pimelea usually grows in swampy, winter-wet places in sand or sandy clay, mainly between Bunbury and Cape Riche, with a disjunct population in the Fitzgerald River National Park, in the Avon Wheatbelt, Esperance Plains, Jarrah Forest, Swan Coastal Plain and Warren bioregions of south-western Western Australia.

Conservation status
Pimelea longiflora is listed as "not threatened" by the Government of Western Australia Department of Biodiversity, Conservation and Attractions.

References

longiflora
Malvales of Australia
Taxa named by Robert Brown (botanist, born 1773)
Plants described in 1810
Flora of Western Australia